Neil Tolson (born 25 October 1973) is an English former footballer who played in the Football League as a striker. He later moved onto a coaching career with Hyde, Altrincham and Stalybridge Celtic.

Career
Born in Dudley, Worcestershire, Tolson began his career with Oldham Athletic. He later joined York City and was their top scorer for the 1996–97 season, with 17 goals in all competitions, including one as York beat Premier League side Everton 3–2 in the second round second leg of the League Cup.

He was released by Leigh RMI in January 2003 and joined Kettering Town in February. He signed for Halifax Town a month later.

Tolson joined Hyde United in July 2003 and then played six matches for Mossley after joining them the following month. He then joined Stalybridge Celtic in October 2003, staying with them until January 2004. He returned to Hyde, and was appointed Assistant Manager of the club in July 2007 before becoming player-manager in September 2008. After eight years at the club playing roles of manager, player and assistant manager, on 4 April 2011 he was relieved of his duties by the new board of directors. He left having scored 82 goals in 176 appearances for the club in all competitions.

In June 2011 he joined Altrincham as assistant manager to Lee Sinnott. In this role, he helped the club achieve promotion via the playoffs to the Conference National. Following Sinnott's departure, Tolson served as caretaker manager from March 2016 until the end of the season.

He later took the role of assistant manager at Stalybridge Celtic F.C. during the 2016/17 season.

In 2018, he took a full-time coaching job in with American club FC Wisconsin.

References

External links

1973 births
Living people
Sportspeople from Walsall
English footballers
Association football forwards
Walsall F.C. players
Oldham Athletic A.F.C. players
Bradford City A.F.C. players
Chester City F.C. players
York City F.C. players
Southend United F.C. players
Leigh Genesis F.C. players
Kettering Town F.C. players
Halifax Town A.F.C. players
Hyde United F.C. players
Premier League players
English Football League players
National League (English football) players
English football managers
Hyde United F.C. managers
National League (English football) managers
Mossley A.F.C. players
Stalybridge Celtic F.C. players